Balchin is a surname. Notable people with the surname include:

 Cassandra Balchin (1962–2012), British women's rights activist, daughter of Nigel
 Elliot Balchin (born 1990), British actor
 John Balchen (1670–1744), sometimes spelled Balchin, Royal Navy Admiral of the White
 Nigel Balchin (1908–1970), British novelist and screenwriter, father of Cassandra
 Robert Balchin, Baron Lingfield (born 1942), British educationalist